Tabarri is a doctrine that refers to the obligation of disassociation with those who oppose God and those who caused harm to and were the enemies of the Islamic prophet Muhammad. 

As Shi'as believe, they believe that the imamate is the inheritor of Risala (apostleship), thus it is the protector of Islam. Muhammad introduced them (Imams). Later every Imam introduced and stipulated the next Imam. So, people who were obstacles to the Imamate and implementation of the true form of Islam and equally the people who were the enemies of Ahl al-Bayt are the enemies of God and it is necessary for all believers to dissociate from them.

Definition 
Every Shia Muslim believes it to be their duty to dissociate themselves from the enemies of God and his Messengers. Muslims differ on whom to consider to be the enemies of God, Muhammad and the Ahl al-Bayt. 

The doctrine of Tabarri itself does not dictate whom to dissociate from or whom to associate with. It dictates the dissociation of those identified as enemies of Ahl al-bayt. The identification is up to every individual.

For example, some people may regard Mua'wiyah as the enemy of Ahl al-Bayt. In that case, it becomes obligatory to dissociate oneself from Mua'wiyah.

Quran

A Quranic verse that can be found that carries the same message as this doctrine.

Baraatun is derived from the same consonantal root as Tabarri.

Shia and Sunni differences 

Since Shias and Sunnis have different sources of hadith, they tend to come to different conclusions regarding whom the enemies of Ahl al-Bayt are.

In some cases, Sunni and Shia have the same view, for example regarding Abū Lahab, Amr ibn Hishām and Umayyah ibn Khalaf. But controversies arise concerning the Sahabah since Sunnis believe in the uprightness of all Sahaba while Shia do not.

Due to the Shia view of early Muslim history, the Shia scholar Mullah Baqir al-Majlisi stated:

Every Muslim believes that it is important to disassociate themselves from the enemies of Muhammad; however, Muslims differ upon who those are.

Shia also believe that this view was held by the descendants of Muhammad. Shia hold as authentic a narration attributed to Muhammad al-Baqir. He was reported to have replied to his disciple who had sought the Imam's opinion regarding Abu Bakr and Umar:

In the same book, on the same page appears the following:

Since Shia hold for authentic narrations where the descendants of Muhammad cursed the Sunni Caliphs, Shia also curse them (which does not literally mean using inappropriate terms for them, but rather asking God to withdraw His mercy from them) when doing tabarri.

This added to the persecution of the Shias by the Sunnis. To protect themselves in times where their life were in jeopardy, Shias used the doctrine of Taqiyya and were prevented from using tabarri in public.

The similar concept used in Sunni theology is the doctrine of Al-Wala' wal-Bara' (al-wala’ being cognate with tawalli, and al-bara’ being cognate with tabarri). The Sunni Umayyad dynasty cursed Ali for 70 years.

See also 
 Event of Mubahala
 Imprecatory Psalms
 Shia view of Umar
 Tabarra agitation

References 

Shia theology